The 1981 National Revenue Tennis Classic, also known as the Buckeye Championships, was a men's tennis tournament played on outdoor hardcourts at the Buckeye Boys Ranch in Grove City, a suburb of Columbus, Ohio in the United States that was part of the 1981 Volvo Grand Prix circuit. It was the 12th edition of the tournament and was held  from August 3 through August 9, 1981. First-seeded Brian Teacher won the singles title and earned $15,000 first-prize money.

Finals

Singles
 Brian Teacher defeated  John Austin 6–3, 6–2
 It was Teacher's only singles title of the year and the 5th of his career.

Doubles
 Bruce Manson /  Brian Teacher defeated  Anand Amritraj /  Vijay Amritraj 6–1, 6–1

References

External links
 ITF tournament edition details

Buckeye Tennis Championships
Buckeye Tennis Championships
Buckeye Tennis Championships
Buckeye Tennis Championships